Lucas Mahias (born 14 April 1989) is a French motorcycle racer for Kawasaki Puccetti Racing in the Superbike World Championship. In 2017 he won the Supersport World Championship aboard a Yamaha YZF-R6, and in 2016 he won the FIM Endurance World Championship riders' title aboard a Yamaha YZF-R1. He has also won the 2014 French Supersport Championship, winning all the 12 races of the season.

Career statistics

Grand Prix motorcycle racing

By season

Races by year
(key) (Races in bold indicate pole position; races in italics indicate fastest lap)

Supersport World Championship

Races by year
(key) (Races in bold indicate pole position; races in italics indicate fastest lap)

Superbike World Championship

Races by year
(key) (Races in bold indicate pole position; races in italics indicate fastest lap)

References

External links

1989 births
Living people
French motorcycle racers
Moto2 World Championship riders
Supersport World Championship riders
Superbike World Championship riders
FIM Superstock 1000 Cup riders
MotoE World Cup riders